Vormedal is a village in Karmøy municipality in Rogaland county, Norway. It sits on the mainland along the Karmsundet strait, directly across the strait from the village of Avaldsnes on the island of Karmøy.

History
Vormedal was originally an area consisting mostly of farmland and it has a documented history going back to the early 1500s. Archaeological finds have indicated that the area has been populated for even longer, possibly for as long as 4000 years.

The area was originally part of the parish (and municipality) of Avaldsnes.  It was situated along the old church route that led churchgoers from the areas around the nearby Førresfjorden in the east as they traveled to visit the Avaldsnes Church, after arriving in Vormedal, they had to take a short boat ride across the Karmsundet. Vormedal was also an important location for travelers coming from the village areas more to the south such as Snik, Røyksund, and Fosen as it was the most direct road to Haugesund.

When the Førre Church in the village of Førre opened in 1893, some of the traffic going to and from the church stopped, and when the new main road called Spannevegen opened in the early 1900s, it connected Haugesund with Røyksund, but it ran east of Vormedal, so a lot of the commercial traffic also stopped. In 1965 the municipality of Avaldsnes was merged with the other municipalities on the island of Karmøy to form the new Karmøy municipality.  In 1978 the first church on mainland Karmøy was opened, Norheim Church, located in the village of Norheim just north of Vormedal.  This new church was the centre of a new parish which also included Vormedal.

Today, Vormedal mostly consists of large residential areas, with one primary and one lower secondary school; three kindergartens as well as a fire station and a small shopping center. Vormedal also has an alginate production facility owned by FMC Health and Nutrition.

References

Villages in Rogaland
Karmøy